The Commander of the Ethiopian Air Force is the chief and highest-ranking officer of the Ethiopian Air Force The current commander is Lieutenant General Yilma Merdasa.

List of officeholders
Source:

Ethiopian Empire (1929-1974) 
 Mischka Babichef (1929-?)
 Colonel Hubert Julian (?-May 1935)
 Colonel John Robinson (May 1935-?)
 Carl Gustaf von Rosen (1947-1962)
 Christian Nilsson (1957-1962)
 Brigadier General Asefa Ayana (1962-1967)
 Major General Abera Woldemariam Mariam (1967-1974)

Derg/PDRE (1974-1992) 
 General Asefa G. Egzi (1974, 3 months)
 Brigadier General Yohannes Woldemariam (1974-6 December 1974)
 Brigadier General Taye Tilahun (6 December 1974-19 September 1977)
 Major General Fanta Belay (19 September 1977-1987)
 Major General Amha Desta (1987-17 May 1989)
 General Alemayehu Agonafir (1989-1992)

Ethiopia (1991-present) 
 Lieutenant General Yilma Merdasa (since 21 June 2018)

References

Ethiopian military personnel
Air force chiefs of staff